The 2017–18 Indiana State Sycamores basketball team represented Indiana State University during the 2017–18 NCAA Division I men's basketball season. The Sycamores, led by eighth-year head coach Greg Lansing, played their home games at the Hulman Center in Terre Haute, Indiana as members of the Missouri Valley Conference. They finished the season 13–18, 8–10 in MVC play to finish in sixth place. They lost in the quarterfinals of the MVC tournament to Illinois State.

Previous season 
The Sycamores finished the 2016–17 season 11–20, 5–13 to finish in a tie for ninth place in MVC play. They lost in the first round of the Missouri Valley Conference tournament to Evansville.

Offseason

Departures

Incoming transfers

2017 recruiting class

Preseason 
In the conference's preseason poll, the Sycamores were picked to finish in eighth place in the MVC. Senior guard Brenton Scott was named to the preseason All-MVC first team.

Roster

Schedule and results

|-
!colspan=9 style=|Exhibition

|-
!colspan=9 style=|Non-conference regular season

|-
!colspan=9 style=| Missouri Valley regular season

|-
!colspan=9 style=| Missouri Valley tournament

Source

References

Indiana State Sycamores men's basketball seasons
Indiana State
Indiana State
Indiana State